Paul Cleave (born 10 December 1974) is a crime fiction author from New Zealand.

Life

Paul Cleave is an internationally bestselling author who is currently dividing his time between his home city of Christchurch, New Zealand, where all of his novels are set, and Europe. His work has been translated into 18 languages. He has won the Ngaio Marsh Award for best crime novel in New Zealand three times, he won the Saint-Maur book festival's crime novel of the year in France, has been shortlisted for the Edgar Award and the Barry Award in the US, and shortlisted for the Ned Kelly Award in Australia.

Writing

His first published novel, The Cleaner, was released by Random House in 2006 and became an international best-seller with sales exceeding 500,000. It was the top-selling crime/thriller title for 2007 on Amazon in Germany. It was also shortlisted for the Ned Kelly Awards for Crime Writing.

In September 2009, Cleave's novel Cemetery Lake was published in the United Kingdom by Arrow Books. When talking about setting his books in Christchurch in an article in Crime Time magazine, Cleave said: "Christchurch is a great setting for crime – it has two sides to it, there's the picture perfect setting you see on postcards everywhere, but there's also a dark, Gotham City feel here which has, sadly, turned this city into the murder capital of New Zealand. I love making Christchurch a character for the books, creating an 'alternate' version of the city, where the main character often muses that 'Christchurch is broken'."

His fourth novel, Blood Men, was released in February 2010.

In 2011, Paul was nominated as a finalist in the Ngaio Marsh Best Crime Novel Award, alongside fellow authors, Neil Cross, Paddy Richardson, and Greg Mckee aka Alix Bosco. Cleave won the award for the book Blood Men, which was published in 2010.

His fifth novel, entitled Collecting Cooper (2011), is again set in his home town of Christchurch (the setting for all his novels) and sees the return of Theodore Tate, who was introduced in Cemetery Lake.

His sixth novel, The Laughterhouse (2012), features Theodore Tate tracking down a crime that started 15 years earlier when he was a rookie officer.

His seventh novel, Joe Victim (2013), features Joe Middleton (from The Cleaner) and follows his story from the moment that The Cleaner ends.

His eighth novel, Five Minutes Alone (2014), features former Detective Carl Schroeder and Theodore Tate locking horns in a cat and mouse chase to find a killer who is allowing rape victims to exact revenge on their attackers.

Trust No One is a stand alone novel featuring a retired crime writer, Jerry Grey, who has developed Alzheimers.  He confesses to crimes that he wrote about - but the lines between what happened in his books and what is happening start to blur.

A Killer Harvest follows the story of Joshua who receives an eye transplant after his fathers dies.  He has been blind from birth but due to a medical mishap, he receives two different eyes, and learns about a thing call cellular memory.  He can see images and memories from two different people - his father and a killer.

Bibliography

Joe Middleton novels 
The books focus on Joe Middleton, a serial killer who works as a janitor for the Christchurch police department.
 2006: The Cleaner
 2013: Joe Victim

Theodore Tate novels 
 2008: Cemetery Lake
 2011: Collecting Cooper
 2012: The Laughterhouse
 2014: Five Minutes Alone
 2022: The Pain Tourist

Standalone novels 
 2007: The Killing Hour
 2010: Blood Men
 2015: Trust No One
 2017: A Killer Harvest
 2019: Whatever It Takes
 2021: The Quiet People

Reviews 

"Most people come back from New Zealand talking about the breathtaking scenery and the amazing experiences. I came back raving about Paul Cleave. These are stories that you won’t forget in a while: relentlessly gripping, deliciously twisted and shot through with a vein of humour that’s as dark as hell. Cleave creates fictional monsters as chilling and as charming as any I’ve ever come across. Anyone who likes their crime fiction on the black and bloody side should move Paul Cleave straight to the top of their must-read list." Mark Billingham, award-winning crime writer

“...an eccentric, intriguing and rather gory story." – Alison Pressley, Good Reading

“Cleave also has an excellent ability to keep the surprises coming as the book unfolds, and at the same time has carefully and cleverly mapped out the journey of a criminally insane mind unravelling." – Lucy Clark, Sunday Telegraph

"Paul Cleave... is a talent to watch" – The Courier-Mail

“It's an exceptional debut by young New Zealand writer Paul Cleave whose concept of telling a story from a mass murderer's viewpoint is compelling." – Ray Chesterton, Saturday Daily Telegraph

"Cleave's writing is uncompromising, unpredictable, and enthralling... Made me vomit – seriously, it's that good" – Jack Heath, author, THE LAB

"...an impressive novel from a talented writer..." Craig Sisterson, Good Reading

"If ever a debut novel deserved the description of 'a tour de force', THE CLEANER by New Zealander Paul Cleave is it.", Denise Pickles, Mary Martin Books, Australia.

References

External links
 Official Website

New Zealand male novelists
New Zealand crime fiction writers
People from Christchurch
1974 births
Living people
21st-century New Zealand novelists
21st-century New Zealand male writers